Doreen Miller, Baroness Miller of Hendon, MBE (née Feldman, 13 June 1933 – 21 June 2014) was a British politician (Conservative Party).

Life
Miller attained an LL.B. in 1957 at the  London School of Economics.

Miller was appointed a Member of the Order of the British Empire (MBE) in the 1990 New Year Honours for services to women's rights.

She served as a Government Whip from 1994 to 1997 and as Opposition Whip from 1997 to 1999. From 1995 to 1997 she served as Government Spokesperson for health and from 1996 to 1997 for Education and Employment.
 
She was created a life peer on 14 October 1993 as Baroness Miller of Hendon, of Gore in the London Borough of Barnet.

Baroness Miller was the Chairman of the charity Attend (then National Association of Hospital and Community Friends) from 1998 to 2003. When she retired in 2003, she was honored as a vice president and held that position until she died in 2014.

From 2002 she was Vice-chair of the Israel Group. She also sat on the House of Lords Information Committee and an EU Sub-Committee

References

External links

1933 births
2014 deaths
Conservative Party (UK) life peers
Members of the Order of the British Empire
Alumni of the London School of Economics
Life peeresses created by Elizabeth II